Pat Martin is a professional broadcaster formerly on KRXQ, 
but as of July 6, does the morning show on sister station KSEG The Eagle, the classic rock station. Sacramento, California.

Early life
Martin grew up in Southern California. He attended Lynwood High School and then Magnolia High School in Anaheim. He then attended Cypress College before transferring to San Diego State University, where he began working at campus radio station KCR-FM.

Martin's first experience in the entertainment industry was in 1968 on the Art Linkletter Show, on the segment known as "Kids Say The Darndest Things".

Career
Upon completion of college, Martin was hired by KGB-FM in San Diego, where he worked from 1978 to 1988, with a one-year break in between to work at KMET-FM in Los Angeles in 1986–1987. In 1988, Martin accepted a job at KRXQ-FM. He has run the midday shift (10 am to 3 pm) since August 8, 1988. He has the longest running consecutive show in Sacramento radio history.
In 2010 radio historian and author Alex Cosper wrote about Martin in his article "Sacramento Radio History" from the web site "playlistresearch.com":

'Not many radio personalities last a long time at one station. Sacramento's rock stations KRXQ and KSEG have been the best at hanging on to air talent. Under Station Manager Jim Fox, Pat Martin programs the music, decides on new music and has been doing the same airshift at the same station longer than anyone else in Sacramento. He has been doing middays at KRXQ since August 1988.

In 2010 Pat Martin reveals the secret to his longevity: "I'm constantly evolving and know how to be a role player. I've been the PD here a couple of times, then not the PD. I don't self-implode, just roll with the changes. But mainly I've made myself, by design, a valuable air talent for KRXQ. I know that every day I have to re-prove myself and earn my place here, and that's what I do. It also helps to have heritage at a station. The listeners consider me a friend, a familiar voice they can tune into day after day. It's a comfort level with the audience that's hard to duplicate."'

In a 2013 interview with music website All Access, Martin stated, “In Sacramento, I am generally known as the guy who put Tesla (band) back together. It happened in 2000. The guys had been fighting for years and I somehow convinced them to resurrect their career with a comeback show at The Arco Arena.”

On August 8, 2018, Martin celebrated his 30th anniversary on KRXQ (98 Rock), with guest appearances on his show from Ben Fong-Torres of Rolling Stone magazine fame, Sacramento Mayor Darrell Steinberg, and Frank Hannon from the Sacramento band Tesla.

References

Living people
Year of birth missing (living people)